Christian Rodrigo Zurita (born July 24, 1979 in  Salta) is an Argentine football midfielder. He currently plays as captain for Mersin İdman Yurdu of the Spor Toto Super League in Turkey.

Zurita started his career at his local club Gimnasia y Tiro de Salta in the Primera Division Argentina in 1997, at the end of the 1997–1998 season the club were relegated to the Argentine 2nd division and Zurita decided to stay with the club.

When Gimnasia y Tiro failed to secure promotion back to the primera, Zurita moved to San Lorenzo, the club with which he has had the most success to date.

In 2003 Zurita was sold to Club Atlético Independiente and 2 seasons later he joined Colón de Santa Fe and during the summer of 2006 Zurita joined Gaziantepspor in Turkey and in 2009 he became the team captain.

Titles

External links
 Profile & Statistics at TFF.org
 Profile & Statistics at Guardian's Stats Centre

1979 births
Living people
People from Salta
Argentine footballers
Club Atlético Colón footballers
Association football midfielders
Club Atlético Independiente footballers
San Lorenzo de Almagro footballers
Gaziantepspor footballers
Mersin İdman Yurdu footballers
Expatriate footballers in Turkey
Süper Lig players
Argentine Primera División players
Argentine expatriate footballers
Argentine expatriate sportspeople in Turkey
Sportspeople from Salta Province